The 2017–18 Mercer Bears men's basketball team represented Mercer University during the 2017–18 NCAA Division I men's basketball season. The Bears, led by tenth-year head coach Bob Hoffman, played their home games at Hawkins Arena on the university's Macon, Georgia campus as fourth-year members of the Southern Conference. They finished the season 19–15, 11–7 in SoCon play to finish in a tie for fourth place. They lost in the quarterfinals of the SoCon tournament to Wofford. They were invited to the College Basketball Invitational where they defeated Grand Canyon in the first round before losing in the quarterfinals to North Texas.

Previous season
The Bears finished the 2016–17 season 15–17, 9–9 in SoCon play to finish in sixth place. They lost in the quarterfinals of the SoCon tournament to East Tennessee State.

Roster

Schedule and results
 
|-
! colspan="9" style=| Non-conference regular season

|-
! colspan="9" style=| SoCon regular season

|-
! colspan="9" style=| SoCon tournament

|-
! colspan="9" style=| CBI

References

Mercer Bears men's basketball seasons
Mercer
Mercer
Mercer Bears
Mercer Bears